Rhoda Evelyn Martin (August 31, 1919 – July 3, 1998) was a Canadian fencer. She competed in the women's individual foil event at the 1948 Summer Olympics.

References

1919 births
1998 deaths
Canadian female fencers
Olympic fencers of Canada
Fencers at the 1948 Summer Olympics
Fencers from Montreal